Allan L. Nadler (born May 8, 1954) is Wallerstein Professor Emeritus of Religious Studies and Former Director of the Jewish Studies Program at Drew University in Madison, New Jersey.

Biography
Nadler was born in Montreal, Quebec, and was educated at McGill and Harvard University, where he received his doctorate in 1988.

He was initially ordained as an Orthodox rabbi by Rabbi Aryeh Leib Baron (1911–2011) of Yeshiva Merkaz ha-Talmud in Montreal, and received a second ordination from the late rabbinical scholar, Rabbi Zvi Hirsch Tennenbaum, Chief Justice, or Dayan of the Orthodox Rabbinical Court of Justice (which authorizes the "KVH" Kosher Supervision) in Boston. He studied Talmud and Rabbinical Codes for two years in the Rabbinical Program at Jews' College in London, England, under the tutelage of Rabbi Dr. Nachum Rabinovitch, and also studied privately for five years with Montreal's Chief Rabbi Pinchas Hirschsprung.

Nadler was the Rabbi of The Charles River Park Synagogues in Boston, at the time an ostensibly Orthodox congregation, with a mixed seating section, and was a member of the Boston Vaad HaRabonim, serving as a Dayan, or judge, on its Rabbinical Court from 1980–1982.

During the period 1984–1992, Nadler became Rabbi of Congregation Shaar Hashomayim in Montreal, Quebec, Canada's oldest, most prestigious and largest Traditional Jewish congregation. Nadler was the first Orthodox-ordained rabbi at this formerly Conservative congregation, which left the Conservative Movement during his tenure. During that time he was adjunct professor of Jewish Studies at McGill University. After resigning from the Shaar Hashomayim, he served as Director of Research of the YIVO Institute in New York City (1992–1999), which holds the world's largest Yiddish and Holocaust Archives and Library.

While at YIVO he served as Rabbi of the Fort Tryon Jewish Center in New York City, an independent Traditional synagogue, and was a visiting professor of Jewish Studies at New York University (1992–1995) and Cornell University (1995–1998).

Also while at YIVO, Nadler led international Jewish efforts to repatriate libraries, archives and Torah scrolls in Lithuania that had been plundered and confiscated by the Nazis, and later held by Soviet authorities. His direct negotiations with then-President of Lithuania, Algirdas Brazauskas, led to the release in 1993, to the New York City offices of YIVO for reproduction and cataloguing, of almost 100 crates of archives that had belonged to YIVO in pre-war Vilna (today, Vilnius, Lithuania), after extensive international coverage of the story.

While on a Sabbatical from Drew University during the 2011–2012 academic year, Nadler was appointed distinguished Visiting Professor at the College of Charleston, in South Carolina, a post which he left after the Fall semester to take a visiting professorship at McGill in January, 2012. While in Montreal, he was called upon to replace, on an interim basis,  Rabbi Ronnie Cahana, of Congregation Beth El, one of the city's leading Conservative synagogues, after Cahana suffered a debilitating stroke. What began as a short term engagement, continued until 2014, and Nadler shuttled between his teaching at Drew to officiating as Beth El's rabbi for the next two years. He engendered surprise, given his Orthodox education and rabbinical credentials, and some controversy, when he insisted on moving Beth El to the religious left, as a condition for remaining with the congregation. Among the reforms he instituted were the triennial (rather than the traditional, annual) liturgical cycle of Torah reading, counting women towards the 'minyan' or necessary quorum of ten for public services, and replacing the Orthodox prayer books with those of the Conservative denomination of Judaism. In an irony widely commented upon by observers of Canadian Jewry, this formerly Orthodox rabbi effectively transformed Beth El into the most progressive Conservative synagogue in the country.

Rabbi Nadler retired from Drew University in 2018, and was named Wallerstein Professor of Jewish Studies Emeritus. He resides in Montreal, Canada.

Criticism of Chabad-Lubavitch movement
Nadler has been a public critic of the Chabad-Lubavitch movement, and of the late Lubavitcher Rebbe, Menachem Mendel Schneerson. His criticisms of Schneerson in  The New York Times, and his subsequent negative assessment of Lubavitch Messianism in a series of articles for The New Republic, were denounced by many Orthodox Canadian and American Rabbis. This was one of many factors that ultimately led Nadler to leave the Orthodox Rabbinate. His evolving theological and historical perspectives, evident in his writings, were however the major reason for his having turned away from Orthodox Judaism, as he articulated in a personal piece in the Baltimore Jewish News. At the same time, Nadler has been an outspoken defendant of, and has published numerous articles championing, some of the world's most distinguished Orthodox rabbis, who were either on the liberal part of the Orthodox religious spectrum, or who had departed Orthodoxy to create new movements of Traditional, or "Halakhic" Judaism. These included Rabbi Dr. Norman Lamm, President of Yeshiva University, Rabbi David Weiss-Halivni, senior Talmudist at the Jewish Theological Seminary of America and Professor of Talmud at Columbia University, and Rabbi Dr. Louis Jacobs, who founded the Masorti (Traditional) Movement in the United Kingdom. Nadler was a disciple of Rabbi Weiss-Halivni in New York, before he immigrated to Israel.

Criticism of Hasidism
Nadler has been a frequent critic of Haredi rabbis and institutions, including the Dean of one of America's most prominent Yeshivas (Rabbinical schools), Lakewood, New Jersey's Beth Medrash Govoha, Rabbi Aryeh Malkiel Kotler, whom he accused, in The Forward, of approving a racist, anti-Gentile book, "Sefer Romemut Yisrael," written by one of the Yeshiva's students. At the same time, Nadler has published scholarly studies of some of the major sects of Hasidism, such as Satmar, Munkatch and Slonim, in addition to a widely noted analysis of the culinary habits of the Hasidim on the Shabbat and Jewish holidays ("Holy Kugel") that has been widely mistaken for an anti-Hasidic satire. In 2007, however, Nadler published two articles that strongly defended the Orthodox Jewish community: one in response to Noah Feldman's negative expose of Modern Orthodoxy in the New York Times magazine, and the other—published in the Montreal English daily newspaper, The Gazette, in defense of that city's large Hasidic community that had been frequently criticized for uncivil behavior towards their French neighbors.

As author
Nadler's book, The Faith of the Mithnagdim: Rabbinic Responses to Hasidic Rapture, the definitive scholarly study of the Jewish antagonists of Hasidic Judaism, commonly known as Misnagdim, that emerged from his more narrow Ph.D. thesis, "A Religion of Limits: The Religious Thought of Rabbi Pinchas of Polotsk" from Harvard University written under the supervision of late Rabbi Dr. Isadore Twersky, is an investigation of the theology of the rabbis who opposed the Hasidic movement in late 18th–early 19th century Eastern Europe. Nadler is a regular book critic for The Forward, an American national Jewish newspaper, to which he has contributed more than one hundred articles, essays and book reviews. He was a prolific feature-article writer for Jewish Ideas Daily (now called Mosaic), penning more than fifty articles and reviews, and currently publishes regularly in the Jewish Review of Books. Nadler is widely considered a leading, and  provocative public intellectual in contemporary Jewish thought.

References

External links
 https://drew.academia.edu/AllanNadler
 New York Times news about Allan Nadler
 http://www.forward.com/articles/charedi-rabbis-rush-to-disavow-anti-gentile-book/
 http://www.forward.com/articles/ultra-orthodox-officials-go-to-bat-for-anti-gentil/
 https://forward.com/author/allan-nadler/
 https://jewishreviewofbooks.com/authors/?a=allan-nadler
 https://www.mcgill.ca/jewishstudies/faculty/allan-nadler
 https://today.cofc.edu/2011/07/18/nadler-named-distinguished-visiting-chair-in-jewish-studies/

Bibliography
Nadler, Allan, "The Faith of the Mithnagdim: Rabbinic Responses to Hasidic Rapture" (Baltimore: The Johns Hopkins University Press, 1997)

1954 births
Living people
Drew University faculty
McGill University alumni
Clergy from Montreal
Harvard University alumni
Canadian Orthodox rabbis
American Conservative rabbis
Canadian Conservative rabbis
21st-century American Jews